Kisumu Rural Constituency was a former electoral constituency in Kenya. It was one of three constituencies of Kisumu District. The constituency was established for the 1963 elections. The constituency has eight wards, all of which elect councillors for Kisumu County Council.

The constituency used to be represented by Robert Ouko, a leading politician who was later assassinated. For the 1988 elections he moved to Kisumu Town Constituency (later split to Kisumu Town West and Kisumu Town East Constituencies).

Members of Parliament

Locations and wards

References 

Kisumu County
Constituencies in Nyanza Province
1963 establishments in Kenya
Constituencies established in 1963
Former constituencies of Kenya